Quashed (foaled 1932) was a British-bred and British-trained racehorse, winner of The Oaks in 1935.

For many years, the Verdict family was not accepted into the British Stud Book because Quashed's dam was effectively a half-bred and it was not until the 1960s era of the July Cup winner Lucasland that the family's merit persuaded the authorities to review their opinion about its eligibility. But though Quashed may not have been granted a presence in the GSB, she could not be prevented from racing and by the time she retired at the end of 1937 she had won ten races worth £19,096. Chief among these was the Ascot Gold Cup in 1936, when she beat the American horse Omaha by a short head after a tremendous battle. She also won The Oaks - having started at 33-1 - the Ormonde Stakes and Jockey Club Cup.

References
 The Complete Encyclopedia of Horse Racing - written by Bill Mooney and George Ennor

1932 racehorse births
Racehorses trained in the United Kingdom
Racehorses bred in the United Kingdom
Non-Thoroughbred racehorses
Thoroughbred family B3
Epsom Oaks winners